Plaza de Castilla is a station on Line 1, Line 9 and Line 10 of the Madrid Metro. It is located in fare Zone A.

References 

Line 1 (Madrid Metro) stations
Line 9 (Madrid Metro) stations
Line 10 (Madrid Metro) stations
Railway stations in Spain opened in 1961